The members of the Delian League/Athenian Empire (c. 478-404 BC) can be categorized into two groups: the allied states (symmachoi) reported in the stone tablets of the Athenian tribute lists (454-409 BC), who contributed the symmachikos phoros ("allied tax") in money, and further allies, reported either in epigraphy or historiography, whose contribution consisted of ships, wood, grain, and military assistance; proper and occasional members, subject members and genuine allies.

Analysis 
The study of the symmachikos phoros provides the following insights: The amount of tax paid by each state is written in Attic numerals. One-sixtieth is dedicated to Athena, the patron goddess of the city. The  membership is not limited  to Ionians or Greek city-states (see Ialysus, Mysians, Eteocarpathians and the Carians whom Tymnes rules). Allied states of Western Greece are not categorized under a fiscal district the Thracian, Hellespontine, Insular, Carian and Ionian phoros of the eastern states; somehow comparable districts to the former Achaemenid satrapies of Skudra, Hellespontine Phrygia, the Yaunâ on this side of the sea, Karka, and the Yaûna across the sea. The categorization of members under these fiscal districts appeared first in the list of 443/2 BC. After 438 BC, the Carian phoros became part of the Ionian district and after c. 425 BC a new Aktaios phoros, comprising the coastal Troad, was created out of the Hellespontine district. During the Sicilian Expedition a fragmentary list suggests that the Athenian state had created a Magna Graecian district. The following names are readable: Naxians, Catanians, Sicels, Rhegians. The only references until now on the Pontic phoros are the list of  425/4 BC and  410/09 BC.

Paradoxically, although the modern current term for the alliance is "Delian League", inscriptions have not yet been found on the island related to the League, and the information about the transfer of the treasure comes from the chronologization of the first Attic tribute list in 454 BC and not by Thucydides, who just informs about the treasure and the center of the Athenian power/alliance being on Delos (Thuc. I.96.97). The first inscription which records the Athenians and allies comes from Delphi, dating to c. 475 BC, is fragmentary, and the names of the allies are not readable or not mentioned. There is an epigraphical gap between 475 and 454 BC, although the phrase Athenians and allies is always present in historiography (Thuc. 1. 109, campaign in Egypt).

The exact location of several inscribed cities is still debated. Athenian cleruchies and colonies like Amphipolis are considered part of the Athenian state and not members of the League.

Fiscal districts (443-409 BC)

Insular phoros
Nesiotikos phoros

Aegina

Euboea
Athenae Diades
Carystus
Chalcis
Diakrioi in Chalcis
Eretria
Poseideion 
Styra

Cyclades

Anaphe
Andros
Belbina
Melos
Naxos
Ios
Keos
Keria Keros?
Kimolos
Kythnos
Mykonos
Paros
Pholegandros
Rineia 
Seriphos
Sifnos
Sikinos
Syros
Tenos
Thera

North Aegean
Hephaestia, Lemnos
Imbros 
Myrina, Lemnos

Unknown region

Grynches

Ionian phoros
Ionikos phoros
Astyrenoi Mysoi in 444/443 and 438/437

Islands
Amorgioi on Amorgos
Chios  425/4 BC (before the fiscal districts in 454/3, 448/7 and 447/6)
Nisyrioi on Nisyros
Oinaioi of Oine on Icaria
Thermaioi of Thermai on Icaria

Aeolis
Cyme
Myrina
Pitane

Ionia

Clazomenae
Colophon
Ephesus
Erythrae
Kyrbissos 
Lebedus
Maiandrioi
Miletus
Pygeles
Myesos or Myessos
Notion
Phocaea
Polichnitai
Priene
Teos

Unknown region (of Ionian or Carian phoros)

Airaies
Amynandes
Boutheia
Chalkeatai 
Cheronnesioi
Diosiritai
Edries Messes
Erines
Gargares
Heraioi
Hiera para Sidymeas
Hyblisses
Idymes
Isindioi
Karbasyandes
Karyes para Idyma (city)  
Kasolabes
Klaundes
Killares, whom [...] rules
Kindyes, whom [...] rules
Kodapes
Koioi
Krosa or Crusa
Kyromes
Lepsimandes
Marathesioi
Oranietai
Pactyes Idymeus ruler
Pasandes
Pladases
Pteleosioi
Sidosioi
Taramptos
Tarbanes
Teichiossa

Carian phoros
Karikos phoros

Caria and Doris

Alinda
Amynandeis
Auliatai Carians
Carians, whom Tymnes rules
Caryanda
Chalketores
Halicarnassus
Kaunians
Kedriatai
Knidos
Kryes
Latmus
Myndus
Myndus in Termera
Pedassus
Sambaktys  Carian ruler
Syagella, which Pikres in Attic (Carian Pigres) rules
Termeres

Dodecanese

Astypalaia
Brykountioi of Karpathos
Eteocarpathians
Ialysos
Kalyndos or Kalynda  (Kalymnos)
Kameiros
Leros
Lindos
Pedies, Lindos
Sarioi
Syme
Telos

Lycia
Kyllandios
Phaselis
Telandros
Telmessos
Tymnessos

Lycaonia
Milyae tribe

Pamphylia
Aspendos
Perga
Sillyon

Cilicia
Ityra
Kelenderis

Thracian phoros
Thrakios phoros

Pieria
Heraclion
Methone

Mygdonia
Aeneia
Bormiscus
Dicaea
Kalindoia

Chalcidice

Acanthus (Athos)
Aphytis
Dion (Athos)
Gale
Mekyberna
Mende
Neapolis. colony of the Mendaeans
Olophyxus
Olynthus
Phegetioi, exact location in Chalcidice unknown
Polichnitai, near Stolos
Potidaea
Sane
Scione
Sermylia
Spartolos
Stolos
Strepsa
Torone
Tragilus

East Macedonia
Argilus
Bergaioi
Neapolis 
Thasos

Thrace proper
Abdera
Aenus
Dicaea at Abdera
Samothrace

Sporades
Ikos city on Alonissos island
Peparethos
Skiathos

Unknown region

Asseritai
Chedrolioi
Haisa 
Galaia
Kossaioi
Miltorioi
Othorioi
Pharbelioi
Pieres at Pergamon
Pergamoteichitai
Sermaies
Singeion
Skablaioi
Smilla Gigonos
Thyssioi
Tinda

Hellespontine phoros
Hellespontios phoros

Islands
Bysbikos  modern İmralı
Proconnesus
Tenedos

Thrace
Bisanthe
Byzantium
Didymoteichitai
Perinthus
Selymbra
Tyrodiza

Thracian Chersonese
Abydos
Alopeconnesus
Elaeus
Kallipolis
Sestus

Asia Minor

Artake
Astyra Troika
Berysioi of the city Birytis
Cyzicus
Chalcedon
Dardaneis
Dareion (Mysia)
Daskyleion
Lampsacus
Madytus
Mysians
Parianoi, citizens of Parion
Priapos
Pythopolis
Sigeion
Zeleia

Unknown region

Arisbaioi
Artaioteichitai
Azeies
Brylleianoi
Daunioteichitai
Gentinioi
Halonesioi
Harpagianoi
Kebrenioi (Kebrene, in Troad region)
Kianoi
Kolones
Lamponeies
Limnaioi
Metropolis (Anatolia) ?
Neandreies
Neapolis (in Western-Macedonia prefecture)?
Otlenoi
Paisenoi
Palaiperkosioi 
Perkosioi of the city Perkote
Serioteichitai
Skapsioi
Sombia
Teria para Brylleion

Aktaiai Poleis
The cities of the Aktaios phoros, the coastal Troad, separated from the Hellespontine district in 427 BC following the Mytilenaean revolt and first appearing in the tribute lists of 425/4 BC.

Achilleion
Hamaxitus
Antandros
Kolonai
Larisa
Nesos
Ophryneion
Palamedeion
Rhoiteion
Pordoselene
Petra
Thymbra

Pontic phoros (Black Sea)
Pontikos phoros

Apollonia Pontice Thrace
Dandakes
Heraclea Bithynia
Karkinitis (Kerkinitis Crimea)
Karosa
Kerasus 
Kimmeria (Kimmerikon Crimea)
Mesembria
Nikonia on Tyras River (now Dniester)
Niphsa
Nymphaion (Crimea) 410/9 BC
Olbia
Patrasys
Tamyrake
Tyras  by Dniester

Other allies

Aegean

Mytilene
Rhodes
Samos

Cyprus
Evagoras I king c.410 BC

Egypt

Inaros rebel c.460 BC

Ionian Islands

Corcyra (source Thucydides Kerkyraika)
Zacynthus
Cephallenia
Leucas

West central Greece

Acarnanians
Locrians

Macedonia

Perdiccas II of Macedon, Antiochos of Orestis, Arrhabaios of Lynkestis (kings, symmachoi) 417-413 BC?
Archelaus I of Macedon Archelas supplies wood to Athens and takes the titles of proxenos and euergetes 407/6 BC

Magna Graecia

Catana  (See also Sicilian Expedition)
Elymians and Segesta 433/2 BC
Leontini  433/2
Rhegium c.433/2 BC

Peloponnese

Argives, Mantineians and Eleans 420 BC

References

Notes

Primary sources
History of the Peloponnesian War by Thucydides
Attic tribute lists in Old Attic Greek IG I³ 259 to IG I³ 291  (454 -415 BC).

IG I³ 259  454/3 BC, IG I³ 269   443/2 BC, IG I³ 270  442/1 BC, IG I³ 271   441/0 BC,  IG I³ 272  440/39 BC, IG I³ 273  439/8 BC, IG I³ 277   435/4 BC, IG I³ 279  433/2 BC, 
IG I³ 282 429/8 BC, 
IG I³ 71   425/4 BC, IG I³ 270  422/1 BC, IG I³ 100  410/09 BC.

Secondary sources
The Athenian Tribute Lists by Benjamin D. Meritt, H. T. Wade-Gery, Malcolm F. McGregor   (1939-1953)
The Athenian Empire Restored: Epigraphic and Historical Studies by Harold B Mattingly, University of Michigan Press, Ann Arbor, 
The power of money: coinage and politics in the Athenian Empire by Thomas J. Figueira
Epigraphic geography: the tribute quota fragments assigned to 421/0-415/4 B.C by Lisa Kallet
Charles F. Edson, Notes of the Thracian phoros, CP 42 (1947)
Thrace by Anna Avramea, Greece. Genikē Grammateia Periphereias Anat. Makedonias-Thrakēs Page 107     (1994)
Mogens Herman Hansen and Thomas Heine Nielsen, An Inventory of Archaic and Classical Poleis (Oxford University Press,)
 G. Pisani, Le liste dei tributi degli alleati di Atene (V sec. a.C.), Padova 1974, pp. 1–91 
(www.academia.edu/30695318/Le_liste_dei_tributi_degli_alleati_di_Atene_V_sec._a.C._)

 
 
Peloponnesian War
Taxation in ancient Athens